The 2017 Rugby Americas North Championship, the 10th edition of the tournament, is a rugby union championship for Tier 3 North American and Caribbean teams. Pool play takes place between 22 April and 1 July. With the 2017 edition not being part of World Cup qualifying, non World Rugby full member teams return to take part in the tournament.

The North Zone returns to the 2015 format with a higher Championship level and a lower Cup level, however the South Zone has been reduced to one level of three teams.

Teams

Notable changes from last year: Turks and Caicos Islands and USA South return after being absent from the 2016 tournament. 2016 participants Jamaica and St. Vincent and the Grenadines did not enter. Dominican Republic will compete for the first time.

Format:Each division plays a single round robin. After pool play is complete, the winners play in the final on July 1.

It was originally planned for Barbados and Curaçao to play a qualifier on April 22 to decide the third team in the South Zone. However, it was cancelled and Barbados was added to the main tournament.

North Zone

Championship

Matches

Cup

Matches

South Zone

Matches

Championship playoff

References

2017
2017 rugby union tournaments for national teams
2017 in North American rugby union
rugby union